The 2018–19 season was the 112th season in existence of Sevilla FC and the club's 18th consecutive season in La Liga, the top league of Spanish football. Sevilla competed in La Liga, the Supercopa de España, the Copa del Rey and the UEFA Europa League.

Kit
On 21 May 2018, Sevilla announced a new three-year kit supply contract with American sportswear giant Nike from 2018–2021.

Players

Current squad

From youth squad

Players In

Total spending:  €76.15M

Players Out

Total income:  €89.8M

Net:  €13.65M

Pre-season and friendlies

Summer

Winter

Spring

Competitions

Overall

La Liga

On 24 July 2018, the La Liga fixtures for the forthcoming season were announced.

League table

Results summary

Results by round

Matches

Copa del Rey

Sevilla entered the competition as the 2017–18 Copa del Rey runners-up.

Matches

Round of 32

Round of 16

Quarter-finals

Supercopa de España

As Barcelona were winners of both the 2017–18 Copa del Rey and 2017–18 La Liga, Sevilla qualified as the Copa del Rey runners-up and faced Barcelona for the season opening Supercopa de España. For the first time in the tournament history, it was a single match hosted in a neutral venue at the Stade Ibn Batouta in Tangier, Morocco.

UEFA Europa League

Spain received three bids to the UEFA Europa League.  The fifth-placed team in La Liga and the Copa del Rey winner qualify for the Europa League group stage.  The sixth-placed team in La Liga begins in the Second qualifying round.  As Barcelona qualified for both the Champions League (1st in La Liga) and the Europa League (Copa del Rey winner), their Europa League place is vacated.  As a result, the highest-placed team in the league which have not yet qualified for European competitions (seventh-placed team, Sevilla) qualify for the Europa league.

Second qualifying round

Third qualifying round

Play-off round

Group stage

Knockout phase

Round of 32

Round of 16

Statistics

Squad appearances and goals
Last updated on 18 May 2019.

|-
! colspan=14 style=background:#dcdcdc; text-align:center|Goalkeepers

|-
! colspan=14 style=background:#dcdcdc; text-align:center|Defenders

|-
! colspan=14 style=background:#dcdcdc; text-align:center|Midfielders

|-
! colspan=14 style=background:#dcdcdc; text-align:center|Forwards

|-
! colspan=14 style=background:#dcdcdc; text-align:center|Players who have made an appearance this season but have left the club

|}

Clean sheets
Last updated on 29 May 2019.

Disciplinary record

Includes all competitive matches.

References

External links

Sevilla FC seasons
Sevilla FC
Sevilla FC